Glen Cove is a city in Nassau County, New York, United States, on the North Shore of Long Island. At the 2020 United States Census, the city population was 28,365 as of the 2020 census.

The city was considered part of the early 20th century Gold Coast of the North Shore, as the areas along the waterfront were developed as large country estates by wealthy entrepreneurs and businessmen such as J.P. Morgan, Phipps, Pratt, and Prybil. Glen Cove also had manufacturing and a diverse population that worked in industry, local agriculture and retail businesses. Of Nassau County's five municipalities, Glen Cove is one of the two municipalities that is a city, rather than a town, the other being Long Beach on the South Shore.

The city was the location of several successful manufacturing facilities in the 20th century. It attracted numerous immigrants from Ireland, Italy, and eastern Europe. More recently, it has been settled by immigrants of later migrations, from Central and South America, and Asia.

History
Succeeding cultures of indigenous peoples had lived in the area for thousands of years. At the time of European contact, bands of the Lenape (Delaware) nation inhabited western Long Island, the areas of New York and New Jersey around the harbor, and along the coast through present-day Pennsylvania and Delaware, as well as along the Delaware River. They spoke an Algonquian language. By 1600 the band inhabiting this local area was called the Matinecock after their location.

Glen Cove was used as a port by English migrants from New England and named Moscheto before 1668. Later in that year, he admitted four residents of Oyster Bay as co-partners in the project: brothers Nathaniel, Daniel, and Robert Coles; and Nicholas Simkins. The five young men named the settlement Musketa Cove Plantation, musketa meaning place of rushes in the Lenape language.

19th century
In the 1830s, steamboats started regular service on Long Island Sound between New York City and Musketa Cove, arriving at a point still called The Landing. As Musketa was negatively associated with mosquito, in 1834 residents changed the name to Glen Cove; this was said to be taken from the misheard suggestion of Glencoe, meaning Glencoe, Scotland.

Glen Cove added population as workers arrived for jobs at the Duryea Corn Starch factory, which operated until 1900. The name Duryea was suggested as a name to replace Mosquito Cove but rejected.

By 1850, Glen Cove had become a popular summer resort for New York City residents. The Long Island Rail Road was extended to Glen Cove in 1867, providing quicker, more frequent service to New York City. The availability of the train and the town's location on Long Island Sound made it attractive to year-round residents, and the population increased.

The vistas afforded of Long Island Sound from the town's rolling hills attracted late 19th-century wealthy industrial barons, including Charles Pratt and his sons, Charles Anderson Dana as well as J.P. Morgan, and F.W. Woolworth. They built large private estates along the island's North Shore. This expanse of settled wealth was part of what became known in the 1920s as the Gold Coast of Nassau County. Part of the Morgan property was donated to the city, and it now is operated as Morgan Park and Beach.

20th century
On January 1, 1918, Glen Cove became an independent city, separating from the Town of Oyster Bay after 250 years. The incorporation was driven by a desire for its tax revenues to be used locally, rather than distributed throughout Oyster Bay. Glen Cove at the time was an especially wealthy part of the town, but the town's provisions for Glen Cove's police service and roads were seen to be inadequate given the amount of taxes levied.  It was unusual in that it incorporated as a city without ever having been an incorporated village.

Before the mid-20th century, most of the mansions were adapted to other than residential purposes. Winfield Hall, the former home of F.W. Woolworth, is privately owned.

John Teele Pratt's estate (The Manor, designed by Charles A. Platt) is operated as the Glen Cove Mansion Hotel and Conference Center.

The Braes, the country estate of Herbert L. Pratt, was purchased by the Webb Institute in 1945. After renovation, it opened the facility in 1947 as an established specialty college for naval architecture and engineering.

George DuPont Pratt's estate Killenworth was purchased by the Soviet Union government in 1951 for use by its United Nations delegation. The Russians have used it for decades to house visitors and as a weekend retreat for its UN staff. When in the United States for meetings at the United Nations, Nikita Khrushchev in 1960, then premier of the Soviet Union, and Fidel Castro, then president of Cuba, separately stayed at Killenworth.

Like many other suburbs, Glen Cove grew rapidly in population after World War II when new residential developments were completed on former pastureland and farms. Many new residents were second- and third-generation descendants of eastern and southern European immigrants, and had moved from childhood homes in Queens or Brooklyn. Some African Americans were descendants of slaves from the colonial period, as colonists had used slaves for domestic help and farm labor; others were descendants of migrants from the South who came to New York City and the area during the Great Migration of the first half of the 20th century.

Since the late 20th century, immigrants to the city have been generally from Latin America and eastern Asia. A Sikh gurdwara established in Glen Cove draws members from the ethnic Indian population in the area.

Historic properties

The U.S. Post Office at Glen Cove, built in 1932 during the Great Depression, was listed on the National Register of Historic Places in 1989. The Justice Court Building, the former city court and later city hall and police headquarters, was added to the NRHP in 1990. It has been renovated and adapted for use as the North Shore Historical Museum. The Old Glen Cove Post Office on Glen Street was listed on the NRHP in 2010; it is now used as an architect's office.

Geography
The city is on the north shore of Long Island on Long Island Sound. The hills that stretch along the shore are terminal moraines left by glaciers of the last ice age.

Glen Cove is located at  (40.867326, −73.627738).

The city of Glen Cove is bordered on three sides by the Town of Oyster Bay, and on the fourth by the Sound.

Greater Glen Cove area 
Glen Cove consists of 1 city, 3 villages and 2 unincorporated hamlets

 Glen Cove
 Glen Head
 Glenwood Landing
 Brookville
 Old Brookville
 Upper Brookville

Demographics

According to the 2010 U.S. census, Glen Cove had a population of 26,964. In 2000, the city had a population of 26,622 people, 9,461 households, and 6,651 families residing in the city limits; in 2000 its population was spread out at 4,006.0 people per square mile (1,545.7/km2). The 2019 American Community Survey determined Glen Clove's population increased to 27,166.

At the 2000 U.S. census, there were 9,461 households, out of which 29.9% had children under the age of 18 living with them, 53.5% were married couples living together, 12.7% had a female householder with no husband present, and 29.7% were non-families. In 2000, 24.1% of all households were made up of individuals, and 11.3% had someone living alone who was 65 years of age or older. The average household size was 2.72 and the average family size was 3.22. In the city, the population was spread out, with 21.2% under the age of 18, 8.1% from 18 to 24, 30.6% from 25 to 44, 22.6% from 45 to 64, and 17.5% who were 65 years of age or older. The median age was 39 years. For every 100 females, there were 92.8 males. For every 100 females age 18 and over, there were 89.4 males.

The median income for a household in the city was $89,000 and the median income for a family was $108,000 in 2000. Males had a median income of $61,900 versus $40,581 for females. The per capita income for the city was $26,627.

In 2019, there were 9,811 households, out of which 20.3% had children under the age of 18 living with them, and 52.2% of the city population were female. Glen Clove had an owner-occupied housing rate of 52.5% and there was an average of 2.70 persons per household from 2015 to 2019. The city had a median household income of $80,702 and per capita income of $40,703. Of the total population, 13.8% were estimated to live at or below the poverty line.

Race and ethnicity 
According to the 2019 American Community Survey, the U.S. Census Bureau determined 54.7% of the population was non-Hispanic white, 8.4% Black or African American, 1.0% American Indian or Alaska Native, 5.3% Asian, 2.7% two or more races, and 25.8% Hispanic or Latin American of any race. In 2010, the racial and ethnic makeup of Glen Cove was 74.2% White (59.4% non-Hispanic white), 7.2% African American, 4.6% Asian, 10.1% some other race, 3.2% two or more races, 0.4% Native American, and 0.1% Hawaiian or Pacific Islander. Hispanics or Latinos of any race made up 27.9% of the population. At the 2000 census, the racial makeup of the city was 60.28% White, 26.40% African American, 0.29% Native American, 4.11% Asian, 0.05% Pacific Islander, 5.72% from other races, and 23.15% from two or more races. Hispanics or Latinos people of any race were 20.0% of the population.

Economy
Acclaim Entertainment had its headquarters in One Acclaim Plaza, located in Glen Cove. Acclaim bought the three-story, Class A office building in 1994 for $4 million.

Glen Cove Creek was channelized in the early 20th century by the US Army Corps of Engineers.

Li Tungsten produced tungsten powder and tungsten carbide powder, along with other specialty products. The company was first known as Wah Chang Smelting and Refining Company, and later as Teledyne Wah Chang.

Columbia Ribbon and Carbon Manufacturing Company opened a Glen Cove research lab in 1932 and produced blue printing inks, carbon paper and typing ribbon until 1980.

Powers Chemco, which made photographic equipment and supplies, was renamed Chemco Technologies in 1987. It was later purchased and renamed Konica Imaging U.S.A., and is today known as Konica Minolta Holding USA Inc. The company closed its Glen Cove factory in 2006 and moved to Michigan.

In 1953 and 1958, Pall Corporation established factories to make filtration products. One site was occupied until 1999, the other until 1971, when the building was sold to August Thomsen Corp.

Photocircuits Corporation began manufacturing circuit boards in 1951, and employed 740 workers when it closed in 2007.

Another company, Slater Electric, began making electrical wiring devices in 1956.

In 1988, Pass and Seymour manufactured electric components using an injection molding process.

Former Gladsky Marine operated a marina and marine repair facility along Glen Cove Creek from the early 1970s until 1999. The site was listed by the EPA as a cleanup site. The remediation of semi-volatile organic compounds and metals from the facility was completed in 2010.

Culture
The Morgan Park Music Festival holds free concerts on Sunday evenings during July and August at the gazebo in Morgan Park.
Glen Cove is the headquarters of the American Stamp Dealers Association.
It features nature trails and a variety of habitats, including a wooded stream valley, fresh water ponds and swamps, a coastal salt marsh, and a stretch of Long Island Sound shoreline. More than 100 species of birds and a variety of small native mammals, reptiles and amphibians inhabit the preserve's grounds. It is the site of the Holocaust Memorial & Educational Center, which offers exhibits and other educational programs.

Nearby are such attractions as the Hillwood Art Museum at C.W. Post Center of Long Island University, Nassau County Museum of Art; Old Westbury Gardens and Mansion, which holds regular concerts; Sagamore Hill National Historic Site, Theodore Roosevelt's summer White House; the Planting Fields Arboretum and Coe Mansion, which also holds concerts; and other live music venues.

Its sister city is Sturno, Italy, where many immigrants came in the 20th century and settled in Glen Cove.

Education

Public schools
The city of Glen Cove and its residents are served by the Glen Cove City School District. Children who live in the City attend the Eugene J. Gribbin/ Katherine A. Deasy Elementary schools for grades K-2 (pre-k offered at Deasy), Landing/ Margaret. A. Connolly schools for grades 3–5, Robert M. Finley Middle School for grades 6–8, and Glen Cove High School for grades 9–12. Finley Middle School was one of ten NASSP Breakthrough Schools. The Glen Cove City School District's "Paired Plan" for elementary schools has the Gribbin and Connolly schools paired, as well as the Deasy and Landing schools. All students from across the city attend joint classes in the central Middle and High schools.

Private schools
There are several private educational institutions inside the city limits:
 All Saints Regional Catholic School, which closed in 2019 [49]
 Friends Academy (preK – 12) is a Quaker-founded private school that is located within the corporation boundaries of Glen Cove but has a Locust Valley mailing address.
 Webb Institute of Naval Architecture and Marine Engineering, a four-year college

Government

The current mayor is Pamela Panzenbeck; this position is elected at-large. She replaced two-term Mayor Tim Tenke, who succeeded Reginald Spinello. The eight-member city council is elected from single-member districts. Panzenbeck and two-thirds of her team were elected in what many political watchers and news outlets deemed a "red wave" of Democratic candidates or incumbents losing races to their Republican competitors in a possible show of voter and constituent dissatisfaction with current government affairs and local conditions. This so-called red wave affected races all over Long Island and other New York enclaves and even (to a smaller extent) states like New Jersey, in what some see as a possible precursor of things to come in the results of the upcoming November 2022 midterm elections.

The town of Oyster Bay had jurisdiction over the area from the 1680s until 1917, when Glen Cove became an independent city. It has its own police, fire protection, and Glen Cove Emergency Medical Services. The fire department and emergency medical services are volunteer agencies. The Office of Emergency Management is responsible for the planning, coordination, and response to natural and man-made emergencies that occur within the city of Glen Cove.

Transportation
The city of Glen Cove is served by the following mass transit services:
 Rail: The Oyster Bay Branch of the Long Island Rail Road has three stations within the boundaries of the city: Sea Cliff, Glen Street and Glen Cove.
 Bus: Nassau Inter-County Express provides service on two routes: N21 (to Great Neck) and N27 (to Hempstead). There is also local service within the city. 

 Express bus: North Fork Express offers weekday commuter service between Glen Cove and Manhattan with stops in Midtown and the Wall Street area.

Representation in media

 Sabrina (1954), starring Humphrey Bogart, Audrey Hepburn, and William Holden – scenes filmed at the Glen Cove train station 
 North by Northwest (1959), starring Cary Grant, Eva Marie Saint, and James Mason – scenes filmed at Old Westbury Gardens. The police station was the former Glen Cove Police Station, which is now used as the North Shore Historical Museum.
 Hello Again (1987), starring Shelley Long and Corbin Bernsen – scenes filmed at Glen Cove train station
Still of the Night (1982) – Brooke's mother's house where dream occurs, and also the climax of the film, is in Glen Cove.
3-2-1 Contact: "What Kids Want to Know About Sex and Growing Up" (1992) – filmed at Robert M. Finley Middle School in Glen Cove
 Batman Forever (1995), starring Val Kilmer and Nicole Kidman – used the Webb Institute (formerly "The Braes" estate) as the exterior for Wayne Manor
 Sabrina (1995), starring Harrison Ford, Greg Kinnear, and Julia Ormond – filmed at Salutations, the former Junius Spencer Morgan III estate, still privately owned
 A Perfect Murder (1998), starring Michael Douglas – filmed at Salutations
 Eyes Wide Shut (1999) – house where the orgy takes place is in Glen Cove.
 Dedication (2007), starring Billy Crudup and Mandy Moore – location used unknown
 Law & Order: Criminal Intent (2008) – "Contract" (Season 7, Episode 12)
 Sex and the City 2 (2010) – some scenes set at Salutations
 Fringe – in Season 3 Episode 7, it was revealed that Agent Broyles lives in Glen Cove.
 Josh Alan Friedman, a resident as a child, set his "autobiographical novel", Black Cracker (2010), in Glen Cove. The book portrays events from his childhood in the early 1960s, when he attended South School, a de facto black school. For a time, Friedman was South School's lone white student.
In 2010, a television commercial for Hunt's tomato sauce was filmed at the Glen Cove Volunteer Fire Department, featuring GCVFD firefighters.
Our Idiot Brother (2011), starring Paul Rudd, Zooey Deschanel, Rashida Jones, Elizabeth Banks – interior shots of mother's house were filmed at a house on Highland Rd.
 Gotham (2014) – Parts were filmed outside and inside of the Webb Institute. The producers catered for the students, as the show had commandeered the school's dining room for filming. The institute also supplied a ship model that was used as a set piece.
 Broad City (2016) - In Season 3, Episode 6 "Philadelphia," parts were filmed at Coves Discount Liquors.
Kevin Can Wait (2017) – In Season 1 Episode 17, Unholy War, the church scenes were filmed at Glen Cove's St. Rocco's Church.

Notable people
 
 Laurie Bird – film actress
 Leslie Buck – businessman, designer of the Anthora coffee cup
Roy Campanella – baseball player with the Brooklyn Dodgers
Daniel Daly – United States Marine, double medal of honor recipient
Howard Davis Jr. – boxer
Dave Dictor – founding member, vocalist of MDC (Millions of Dead Cops)
Ashanti Douglas – singer and actress
John Edward – psychic medium 
Whitey Ford – Yankees baseball player
Mike Grella – professional soccer player for the Coloumbus Crew SC
Priscilla Johnson McMillan - journalist and writer
Carl Karilivacz – NFL player
Robert F. Kennedy - Attorney general, Senator, and presidential candidate
Nick Markakis – baseball player
Brian Myers – professional wrestler
Thomas Pynchon – novelist
Christine C. Quinn - former member of the New York City Council and former Speaker of the NYC Council, politician, housing activist, homeless advocate and organization manager, former head of Anti-Violence Project, CEO and President of Women in Need
Chuck Schuldiner – founding member, guitarist, and vocalist of the death metal band Death
Susan Sensemann – artist
Tom Suozzi – U.S. Congressman
MaliVai Washington – tennis player

See also 

 Welwyn Preserve, previously the estate of Harold I. Pratt, in Glen Cove

References
48. https://www.liherald.com/stories/victory-for-panzenbeck-in-glen-cove,135938#.YlV0tT2-Jz4 49. https://www.liherald.com/glencove/stories/all-saints-catholic-school-of-gc-to-close-in-june,110957                                                                                                                                                                                                                                                          External links

 
 Civil Service website, Glen Cove 
 Glen Cove History, Glen Cove Public Library
 Glen Cove Heritage, official website
 Landing Pride, civic association
 Glen Cove's Historic Estates, Old Long Island

 
Cities in Nassau County, New York
Cities in New York (state)
Cities in the New York metropolitan area
Long Island Sound
Populated coastal places in New York (state)